Jonathan Firstenberg is an American television composer, music supervisor, producer and consultant.

Biography
Jonathan Firstenberg was born in 1949 in Brooklyn, and grew up on Long Island, in Floral Park and Woodbury. Inspired by his parents, Firstenberg studied different varieties of music in his youth, and started playing rock and orchestral music with a violin and a guitar. When he graduated from college, Firstenberg started his career in music by taking a job with Hansen Music Publishing, in New York City.

He is married to Natalie Vicki (Hillman) Firstenberg, a transpersonal therapist and minister, specializing in healing through relationships, especially couples' counseling, and those who are longing to deepen their creative expression.

In 2005, Firstenberg auditioned and was recruited to lead the Universal Production Music Library, a division of Universal Music Publishing Group, as creative director. In this role, he is responsible for carrying out the vision and mission of Universal Music Publishing Group, CEO David Renzer and Scott James, Sr. V.P. Licensing for Film and Television and New Technologies. Firstenberg stated in an interview that he hopes to inspire composers, songwriters, producers, musicians and vocalists to invest in their music efforts by placing some of their works into the library system.

Credits
Cats, Cops and Stuff (1990)
Born to be Mild (1990)
The Long Kiss Goodnight (1996)
Santa Barbara
Guiding Light
Another World
Capitol
Days of Our Lives
All My Children
General Hospital

Awards and nominations
Daytime Emmy Awards:

Won, 1993, Outstanding Achievement in Music Direction and Composition for a Drama Series for: "Santa Barbara" (shared with Dominic Messinger and Rick Rhodes)
Won, 1996, Outstanding Music Direction and Composition for a Drama Series for: "Guiding Light" (shared with Robyn Cutler, Michael Licari, Rick Rhodes, Ron Cohen, John Henry Kreitler, Wes Boatman, Danny Lawrence, John E. Young, David Grant, Barry De Vorzon, Richard Hazard, Edward Dzubak, and Alan Bellink)

Sources

External links

Reel Money - A real-world guide to getting music into film and TV soundtracks.

Living people
American male composers
21st-century American composers
Musicians from Brooklyn
1949 births
People from Floral Park, New York
People from Woodbury, Nassau County, New York
21st-century American male musicians